This is a list of rulers of Moldavia, from the first mention of the medieval polity east of the Carpathians and until its disestablishment in 1862, when it united with Wallachia, the other Danubian Principality, to form the modern-day state of Romania.

Notes

Dynastic rule is hard to ascribe, given the loose traditional definition of the ruling family (on principle, princes were chosen from any branch, including a previous ruler's bastard sons – being defined as os de domn – "of domn marrow", or as having hereghie – "heredity" (from the Latin hereditas); the institutions charged with the election, dominated by the boyars, had fluctuating degrees of influence). The system itself was challenged by usurpers, and became obsolete with the Phanariote epoch, when rulers were appointed by the Ottoman Sultans. Between 1821 and 1862, various systems combining election and appointment were put in practice. Moldavian rulers, like Wallachian and other Eastern European rulers, bore the titles of Voivode or/and Hospodar (when writing in Romanian, the term Domn (from the Latin dominus) was used).

Most rulers did not use the form of the name they are cited with, and several used more than one form of their own name; in some cases, the ruler was only mentioned in foreign sources. The full names are either modern versions or ones based on mentions in various chronicles.

The list is brought up to date for the first rulers, following the documented studies of Ștefan S. Gorovei and Constantin Rezachevici.

List

Princes of Moldavia

House of Dragoș

House of Bogdan-Mușat

Houses of Basarab (Drăculeşti line)  and Bogdan-Muşat

Houses of Basarab (Drăculești line)  and Movilești

Various dynasties

Phanariotes (1711–1821)

See also
List of rulers of Wallachia

References

 Constantin Rezachevici - Cronologia critică a domnilor din Țara Românească și Moldova a. 1324 - 1881, Volumul I, Editura Enciclopedică, 2001,

 Rulers of Moldavia

 
Rulers
Moldavian rulers
Moldavia